Mark Bradley (born 1982) is an American football wide receiver.

Mark Bradley may also refer to:
 Mark Edward Bradley (1907–1999), U.S. Air Force general
 Mark Bradley (footballer, born 1976), Scottish footballer
 Mark Bradley (footballer, born 1988), Welsh international footballer
 Mark Bradley (baseball) (born 1956), American baseball player
 Mark Bradley (cricketer) (born 1966), New Zealand cricketer
 Mark Bradley (Gaelic footballer) (born 1994/95)

See also 
 Mark Bradly (born 1977), Australian rules footballer